The Total Drop were a four piece art rock/new wave band from New Cross in south-east London formed in February 2005 by Anna Vincent (vocals, keyboard), James Vincent (bass, vocals), Ivan Misquita-Rice (drums), and Sam Soper (guitar), who also produced most of the band's music.

The group took their name from a song called (Do The) Total Drop by Deptford post-punk band The Homosexuals., and released records through their own DIY label Snakes & Ladders before disbanding in 2007.

With a sound which ranged between melodic new wave, wiry Post-punk and angular art rock, the band took influence from the likes of Magazine, Talking Heads, The Slits, Wire, Gang of Four, and Yeah Yeah Yeahs, and played extensively in London, and also in New York City, when, in September 2006 they were invited by a music promoter to play dates at Trash Bar, Arlene's Grocery and Pianos.

Snakes & Ladders released the band's first single in January 2007, and although the band never officially released an album, in 2021 a 10-song collection entitled T.T.D. was made available via Bandcamp, forming a retrospective of songs recorded between 2005 and 2007.

Members of The Total Drop went on to form various other musical projects, most notably Electropop outfit My Tiger My Timing, and Dreampop band Heavy Heart.

Press

The Total Drop were reviewed in several underground music fanzines as well as more mainstream UK magazines including ArtRocker, Maps (online), I Think You'll Find That's Fireworks (online), Lobster Quadrille and Antenna.

The band also had tracks regularly played on ArtRocker's weekly radio programme on London's Resonance FM and were mentioned on BBC Radio 1's Best of Unsigned programme with Huw Stephens when Snakes & Ladders were made 'DIY-label-of-the-week'.

In February 2007, The Total Drop were interviewed as part of a feature on new London bands in Above Magazine.

Some notable quotes:

"An abundance of catchy hooks and a voice of pure magnetism"

"Each tune sounds like a potential single...this band will be massive"

"The Total Drop are a pop band"

"...with great certainty one would expect to hear a lot more from these bands and this label in the coming years."

"...enough innovation to keep the scene on its toes for another decade, genius!"

"...new and challenging while still keeping a heart of pop." 

"...a spangle-powered scuzz-pop gem of considerable charm!"

"...a dizzying array of rhythms and interwoven guitar and bass."

"...pure pop without an inch of fat, but effortlessly cool at the same time."

Discography

Albums
 T.T.D. - Snakes & Ladders Records (February 2021)

EPs
 TTD NYC EP - Snakes & Ladders Records S&LCD003 (limited release EP put together when the band visited New York City in September 2006)

Singles
 Your Excellency - Snakes & Ladders Records  S&LCD004 (January 2007)
 Nuit Américaine - Snakes & Ladders Records  S&L007 (May 2007)

Compilations
 Prime Number - On Snakes & Ladders Records compilation 'S&LCD001' (March 2006)
 An Educated Guess - On Snakes & Ladders Records compilation 'S&LCD001' (March 2006)
 Prime Number - On Dance At My feet compilation 'skyburstexplosion' (May 2006)
 An Educated Guess - On ArtRocker covermount compilation 'DIY Labels 2' (August 2006)
 An Educated Guess - On Lobster Quadrille Magazine covermount compilation (October 2006)

Videos
An Educated Guess - promotional video shot by Really Urban Films (November 2006).

Members 
 Anna Vincent – lead vocals, guitar, keyboards
 James Vincent – bass, backing vocals
 Sam Soper – guitar, production
 Ivan Misquita-Rice – drums

See also
Snakes & Ladders Records
The Roaring Twenties
My Tiger My Timing
Heavy Heart

Notes

External links
The Total Drop on Bandcamp
The Total Drop on Soundcloud
The Total Drop on MySpace

English art rock groups
English indie rock groups
Post-punk revival music groups
Musical groups from London